Oberasbach is a municipality in the district of Fürth, in Bavaria, Germany. It is situated 6 km southwest of Fürth, and 10 km west of Nuremberg (centre).

Stadtrat 

The local council has 24 members. 
The election in 2020 showed the following results:
 9 seats (CSU)
 4 seats (The Greens)
 3 seats (Free voters)
 3 seats (SPD)
 2 seats (BI Oberasbach)
 1 seat (AfD)
 1 seat (FDP)
 1 seat (The Left)

Twin towns
Oberasbach is twinned with:

  Niederwürschnitz, Germany
  Oława, Poland
  Riolo Terme, Italy

Personalities

 Steffen Weinhold, (born 1986), handball player
 Deniz Aytekin, (born 1978), football referee
 Maurice Müller, (born 1992), soccer player

See also

References

Fürth (district)